Archduchess Maria Isabella of Austria, Princess of Tuscany (21 May 1834 – 14 July 1901), was an Archduchess of Austria and Princess of Tuscany by birth and Countess of Trapani by marriage to her uncle Prince Francis, Count of Trapani.

Maria Isabella was born in Florence, Grand Duchy of Tuscany, as the daughter of Leopold II, Grand Duke of Tuscany and his second wife, Princess Maria Antonia of the Two Sicilies.

Biography

Marriage and issue

Maria Isabella married her uncle Prince Francis, Count of Trapani, youngest son of Francis I of the Two Sicilies and his wife Maria Isabella of Spain, on 10 April 1850. Maria Isabella and Francis had six children:

Princess Maria Antonietta of Bourbon-Two Sicilies (16 March 1851 – 12 September 1938)
 ∞ Prince Alfonso, Count of Caserta on 8 June 1868 in Rome, had 12 issue.

Prince Leopoldo Maria of Bourbon-Two Sicilies (24 September 1853 – 4 September 1870)
Princess Maria Teresa Pia of Bourbon-Two Sicilies (7 January 1855 – 1 September 1856)
Princess Maria Carolina of Bourbon-Two Sicilies (21 February 1856 – 7 April 1941)
 ∞ Count Andrzej Przemysław Zamoyski on 19 November 1885 in Paris, had 7 children.

Prince Ferdinando Maria of Bourbon-Two Sicilies (25 May 1857 – 22 July 1859)
Princess Maria Annunziata of Bourbon-Two Sicilies (21 September 1858 – 20 March 1873)

On 14 July 1901, Maria Isabella died in Lucerne, Switzerland.

Honours
  : 698th Dame of the Order of Queen Maria Luisa - .

Ancestry

References

1834 births
1901 deaths
House of Habsburg
Austrian princesses
Tuscan princesses
House of Bourbon-Two Sicilies
Italian countesses
Nobility from Florence
Burials at Père Lachaise Cemetery
Daughters of monarchs